During the 2018–19 S.C. Braga season, the club competed in the Primeira Liga, Taça de Portugal, Taça da Liga and UEFA Europa League.

Players

First-team squad

 (Captain)

Competitions

Primeira Liga

League table

Taça de Portugal

Taça da Liga

Group stage

Semi-final

UEFA Europa League

Statistics

Goalscorers

Notes

References

S.C. Braga seasons